Luca Prodan (17 May 1953 – 22 December 1987) was an was an Argentina-based italian-scottish musician and singer who rose to fame as the leading vocalist of Sumo, one of the most influential rock bands of Argentina, and is widely considered one of the country's most important artists. He was the older brother of film actor and composer Andrea Prodan.

Biography 

Luca Prodan was born in Rome on 17 May 1953, and he had not only Italian origins but Scottish as well. He was born after the return of the Prodan family from China: his father had set up a prosperous business in ancient Chinese pottery that became untenable after the Japanese invasion of China during World War II.

In his youth, his parents sent him to Britain to the prestigious Gordonstoun College, the same school attended by Prince Charles, Prince of Wales; Prodan left a year before graduating. After that, he moved to London.

He moved to London in the 1970s and worked at EMI. While in London, he formed his first band, The New Clear Heads, which shared aesthetics with contemporary punk bands like XTC, The Fall, Joy Division (who inspired the title of the first Sumo album: Divididos por la Felicidad, Spanish for "Divided By Joy") and Wire.

In 1981, after a heroin crisis in late 1970s London, he moved to the farm of an old Anglo-Argentine friend, Timmy McKern, in the central hills of Córdoba Province, Argentina, seeking peace to try to kick his heroin addiction.

After some time at the farm in the Traslasierra valley, he settled in Hurlingham (a suburb of Buenos Aires), where he founded and led Sumo and the Hurlingham Reggae Band.

In 1986, he was part of "El día que reventaron las lámparas de gas", a short film directed by Rodrigo Espina

Death and legacy 

Prodan died either of a heart attack or cirrhosis in Buenos Aires shortly before Christmas 1987.

Two posthumous records of pre-Sumo recordings are available and provide an "insider's" view of the artist. Recorded mostly in the Traslasierra region of Córdoba, Argentina (his initial home territory), they bear testimony to his musical influences and inspiration: Peter Hammill, David Bowie, Jim Morrison, Nick Drake, Lou Reed, Ian Dury, Ian Curtis of Joy Division and Bob Marley.

After his death, two bands were formed by former Sumo members: Divididos and Las Pelotas. It is believed that the actual names came after a heated Prodan's answer referring to an eventual Sumo break-up: ""Are we breaking up, you say? Bollocks we are!""; hence Divididos (Spanish for "The Divided") and Las Pelotas (Spanish for "Bollocks").

Discography

With Sumo 
 Corpiños en la madrugada [Bras in the Morning] (EP, 1983)
 Divididos por la felicidad [Divided by Joy] (1985)
 Llegando los monos [Here Come the Monkeys] (1986)
 After chabón (1987)
 Fiebre [Fever] (1989)

Solo 
 Time Fate Love, recorded in 1980. Released in 1996
 Perdedores Hermosos [Beautiful Losers], recorded in 1981. Released in 1997

References

External links 

 

1953 births
1987 deaths
Deaths from cirrhosis
Argentine people of Scottish descent
Italian emigrants to Argentina
Naturalized citizens of Argentina
20th-century Argentine male singers
Argentine male singer-songwriters
People educated at Gordonstoun